Spanish Nationalist Party (PNE) was a Spanish nationalist political party active in the Second Spanish Republic. The PNE was founded by José María Albiñana in 1930.

Ideology
The main points of the party platform were:
 Defence of the unity of Spain. Rejection of the Autonomous Regions.
 Respecting the "religious principles".
 Monarchism.
 Defense of social order. Opposition to class struggle.
 "Agrarian nationalism" and promoting cooperation and agricultural credit.
 Equitable taxation.
 Free elementary education and letting popular classes access to middle and upper education.
 Nationalization of health services and social assistance.
 International action to prevent the discrediting of Spain.

The ideological position of the PNE has been defined as "ultra-reactionary" and traditionalist. In fact, in his last will, José María Albiñana asked his followers to join the Traditionalist Communion.

History
The party gained an MP (José María Albiñana) for Madrid in the general elections of 1936. The party was dissolved shortly after the military coup of 1936.

References 

Far-right political parties in Spain
Conservative parties in Spain
Catholic political parties
Spanish nationalism